Sterrett is a census-designated place and unincorporated community in Shelby County, Alabama, United States. Its population was 712 as of the 2010 census. Sterrett was named in honor of a prominent local family, which included Alphonso A. Sterrett, who served in the Alabama Legislature. At one point in its history, Sterrett was a center of pottery production in central Alabama. Also known as Jugtown, Sterrett was once home to at least ten potters. The pottery produced here was classified as being part of the East Alabama style of pottery, which used high quality clay and a two-toned glaze decoration. William Hilliard Falkner purchased the Sterrett Pottery Works in 1874 and operated it until 1903. His father, Joel Falkner, was also a potter in Sterrett.

Sterrett was once home to Twin Pines Conference Center, which was founded by Robert "Bob" Saunders. The Bob Saunders Family Covered Bridge is located on the property of the former conference center and is listed in the World Guide to Covered Bridges.

Geography
The community is in the northeastern part of Shelby County. Alabama State Route 25 runs through the community, leading southeast 7 mi (11 km) to Vincent and northwest 13 mi (21 km) on a particularly winding and mountainous route to the city of Leeds.

Demographics

References

Census-designated places in Shelby County, Alabama
Census-designated places in Alabama